Stereolab are an Anglo-French avant-pop band formed in London in 1990. Led by the songwriting team of Tim Gane and Lætitia Sadier, the group's music combines influences from krautrock, lounge and 1960s pop music, often incorporating a repetitive motorik beat with heavy use of vintage electronic keyboards and female vocals sung in English and French. Their lyrics have political and philosophical themes influenced by the Surrealist and Situationist movements. On stage, they play in a more feedback-driven and guitar-oriented style. The band also draw from funk, jazz and Brazilian music, and were one of the first artists to be dubbed "post-rock". They are regarded among the most innovative and influential groups of the 1990s.

Stereolab were formed by Gane (guitar and keyboards) and Sadier (vocals, keyboards and guitar) after the break-up of McCarthy. The two were romantically involved for fourteen years and are the group's only consistent members. Other longtime members included 1992 addition Mary Hansen (backing vocals, keyboards and guitar), who died in 2002, and 1993 addition Andy Ramsay (drums). The High Llamas' leader Sean O'Hagan (guitar and keyboards) was a member from 1993 to 1994 and continued appearing on later records for occasional guest appearances.

Throughout their career, Stereolab has had moderate commercial success. The band were released from their recording contract with Elektra Records, and their self-owned label Duophonic signed a distribution deal with Too Pure and later Warp Records. After a ten-year hiatus, the band reunited for live performances in 2019.

History

1990–1993: Formation

In 1985, Tim Gane formed McCarthy, a band from Essex, England, known for their left-wing politics. Gane met Lætitia Sadier, born in France, at a 1988 McCarthy concert in Paris and the two quickly fell in love. The musically-inclined Sadier was disillusioned with the rock scene in France and soon moved to London to be with Gane and pursue her career. In 1990, after three albums, McCarthy broke up and Gane immediately formed Stereolab with Sadier (who had also contributed vocals to McCarthy's final album), ex-Chills bassist Martin Kean and Gina Morris on backing vocals. Stereolab's name was taken from a division of Vanguard Records demonstrating hi-fi effects.

Gane and Sadier, along with future band manager Martin Pike, set up a record label called Duophonic Super 45s which, along with later offshoot Duophonic Ultra High Frequency Disks, would become commonly known as "Duophonic". Gane said that their "original plan" was to distribute multiple 7 and 10-inch records "–to just do one a month and keep doing them in small editions". The 10 inch vinyl EP Super 45, released in May 1991, was the first release for both Stereolab and the label, and was sold through mail order and through the Rough Trade Shop in London. Super 45s band-designed album art and packaging was the first of many customised and limited-edition Duophonic records. In a 1996 interview in The Wire, Gane calls the "do-it-yourself" aesthetic behind Duophonic "empowering", and said that by releasing one's own music "you learn; it creates more music, more ideas".

Stereolab released the EP, Super-Electric in September 1991, and a single, titled Stunning Debut Album, followed in November 1991 (which was neither debut nor album). The early material was rock and guitar-oriented; of Super-Electric, Jason Ankeny wrote in AllMusic that "Droning guitars, skeletal rhythms, and pop hooks—not vintage synths and pointillist melodies—were their calling cards ..." Under the independent label Too Pure, the group's first full-length album, Peng! was released in May 1992. A compilation titled, Switched On, was released in October 1992 and would be part of a series of compilations that anthologise the band's more obscure material.

Around this time, the line-up consisted of Gane and Sadier plus vocalist and guitarist Mary Hansen, drummer Andy Ramsay, bassist Duncan Brown, and keyboardist Katharine Gifford. Hansen, born in Australia, had been in touch with Gane since his McCarthy days. After joining, she and Sadier developed a style of vocal counterpoint that distinguished Stereolab's sound. Sean O'Hagan of the High Llamas joined as a quick replacement for their touring keyboardist, but was invited for their next record and "was allowed to make suggestions".

1993–2001: Sign to Elektra
Stereolab introduced easy-listening elements into their sound with the EP Space Age Bachelor Pad Music, released in March 1993. The work raised the band's profile and landed them a major-label American record deal with Elektra Records. Their first album under Elektra, Transient Random-Noise Bursts with Announcements (August 1993), was an underground success in both the US and the UK. Mark Jenkins commented in Washington Post that with the album, Stereolab "continues the glorious drones of [their] indie work, giving celestial sweep to [their] garage-rock organ pumping and rhythm-guitar strumming". In the UK, the album was released on Duophonic Ultra High Frequency Disks, which is responsible for domestic releases of Stereolab's major albums.

In January 1994, Stereolab achieved their first chart entry when the 1993 EP Jenny Ondioline, entered at number 75 on the UK Singles Chart. (Over the next three years, four more releases by the band would appear on this chart, ending with the EP Miss Modular in 1997.) Their third album, Mars Audiac Quintet, was released in August 1994. The album contains the single "Ping Pong", which gained press coverage for its explicitly Marxist lyrics. The band focused more on pop and less on rock, resulting in what AllMusic described as "what may be the group's most accessible, tightly-written album". It was the last album to feature O'Hagan as a full-time member. He would continue to make guest appearances on later releases. The group issued an EP titled Music for the Amorphous Body Study Center in April 1995. The EP was their musical contribution to an interactive art exhibit put on in collaboration with New York City artist Charles Long. Their second compilation of rarities, titled Refried Ectoplasm (Switched On, Vol. 2), was released in July 1995.

The band's fourth album, Emperor Tomato Ketchup (March 1996), was a critical success and was played heavily on college radio. A record that "captivated alternative rock", it represented the group's "high-water mark" said music journalists Tom Moon and Joshua Klein, respectively. The album incorporated their early krautrock sound with funk, hip-hop influences and experimental instrumental arrangements. John McEntire of Tortoise also assisted with production and played on the album. Katharine Gifford was replaced by Morgane Lhote before recording, and bassist Duncan Brown by Richard Harrison after. Lhote was required to both learn the keyboards and 30 of the group's songs before joining.

Released in September 1997, Dots and Loops was their first album to enter the Billboard 200 charts, peaking at number 111. The album leaned towards jazz with bossa nova and 60's pop influences. Barney Hoskyns wrote in Rolling Stone that with it the group moved "ever further away from the one-chord Velvets drone-mesh of its early days" toward easy-listening and Europop. A review in German newspaper Die Zeit stated that in Dots and Loops, Stereolab transformed the harder Velvet Underground-like riffs of previous releases into "softer sounds and noisy playfulness". Contributors to the album included John McEntire and Jan St. Werner of German electropop duo Mouse on Mars. Stereolab toured for seven months and took a break when Gane and Sadier had a child. The group's third compilation of rarities, Aluminum Tunes, was issued in October 1998.

Their sixth album, Cobra and Phases Group Play Voltage in the Milky Night, was released in September 1999. It was co-produced by McEntire and American producer Jim O'Rourke, and was recorded with their new bassist, Simon Johns. The album received middling reviews from critics and peaked at number 154 on the Billboard 200. An unsigned NME review said that "this record has far more in common with bad jazz and progressive rock than any experimental art-rock tradition." In a 1999 article of Washington Post, Mark Jenkins asked Gane about the album's apparent lack of guitars; Gane responded, "There's a lot less upfront, distorted guitar ... But it's still quite guitar-based music. Every single track has a guitar on it."

Stereolab's seventh album, Sound-Dust (August 2001), rose to number 178 on the Billboard 200. The album also featured producers McEntire and O'Rourke. Sound-Dust was more warmly received than Cobra and Phases Group…. Critic Joshua Klein said that "the emphasis this time sounds less on unfocused experimentation and more on melody ... a breezy and welcome return to form for the British band." Erlewine of Allmusic stated that the album "[finds the group] deliberately recharging their creative juices" but he argued that Sound-Dust was "anchored in overly familiar territory."

2002–2008: Death of Hansen and later releases
In 2002, as they were planning their next album, Stereolab started building a studio north of Bordeaux, France. ABC Music: The Radio 1 Sessions; a compilation of BBC Radio 1 sessions was released in October. In the same year, Gane and Sadier's romantic relationship ended.

On 9 December 2002, Hansen was killed when hit by a truck while riding her bicycle in London. She was 36. Writer Pierre Perrone said that her "playful nature and mischievous sense of humour came through in the way she approached the backing vocals she contributed to Stereolab and the distinctive harmonies she created with Sadier." For the next few months, Stereolab lay dormant as the members grieved. They eventually decided to continue. Future album and concert reviews would mention the effects of Hansen's absence.

The EP Instant 0 in the Universe (October 2003) was recorded in France, and was Stereolab's first release following Hansen's death. Music journalist Jim DeRogatis said that the EP marked a return to their earlier, harder sound—"free from the pseudo-funk moves and avant-garde tinkering that had been inspired by Chicago producer Jim O'Rourke".

Stereolab's eighth album, Margerine Eclipse, was released on 27 January 2004 with generally positive reviews, and peaked at number 174 on the US Billboard 200. The track "Feel and Triple" was written in tribute to Hansen; Sadier said, "I was reflecting on my years with her ... reflecting on how we sometimes found it hard to express the love we had for one another." Sadier continued, "Our dedication to her on the album says, 'We will love you till the end', meaning of our lives. I'm not religious, but I feel Mary's energy is still around somewhere. It didn't just disappear." The Observers Molloy Woodcraft gave the album four out of five stars, and commented that Sadier's vocal performance as "life- and love-affirming", and the record as a whole as "Complex and catchy, bold and beatific." Kelefa Sanneh commented in Rolling Stone that Margerine Eclipse was "full of familiar noises and aimless melodies". Margerine Eclipse was Stereolab's last record to be released on American label Elektra Records, which shut down that same year. Future material would be released on Too Pure, the same label which had released some of the band's earliest material.

The group released six limited-edition singles in 2005 and 2006, which were anthologised in the 2006 compilation Fab Four Suture, and contained material which Mark Jenkins thought continued the brisker sound of the band's post-Hansen work. By June 2007, Stereolab's line-up comprised Tim Gane, Lætitia Sadier, Andy Ramsay, Simon Johns, Dominic Jeffrey, Joseph Watson, and Joseph Walters. In 2008, the band issued their next album under the label 4AD titled, Chemical Chords, which "[downplays] their arsenal of analog synths in favor of live instrumentation". The release was followed by an autumn tour in Europe, the United States and Canada. 
In February 2009, they toured Australia as part of the St Jerome's Laneway Festival.

2009–2019: Hiatus and reunion
In April 2009, Stereolab manager Martin Pike announced a pause in their activities for the time being. He said that it was an opportune time for the members to move on to other projects. Not Music, a collection of unreleased material recorded at the same time as Chemical Chords, was released in 2010. In 2013, Gane and Sadier, who both focused on Cavern of Anti-Matter and solo work respectively, performed at the All Tomorrow's Parties festival held at Pontins in Camber Sands.

In February 2019, the group announced a tour of Europe and the United States to coincide with expanded, remastered reissues of several of the albums released under Warp Records. Stereolab were part of the lineup for 2019's Primavera Sound festival, taking part on the weekend of 30 May in Barcelona, Spain, and the following weekend in Porto, Portugal. It was the group's first live performance since 2009.
Musical style

Stereolab's music combines a droning rock sound with lounge instrumentals, overlaid with sing-song female vocals and pop melodies, and has also made use of unorthodox time signatures. It has been generally described as avant-pop, indie pop, art pop, indie electronic, indie rock, post-rock, experimental rock, and experimental pop. Sadier remarked in 2015 that "[the band's] records were written and recorded very quickly… we would write 35 tracks, sometimes more".

The band have played on vintage electronic keyboards and synthesizers from brands such as Farfisa and Vox and Moog. Gane has praised the instruments for their versatility: "We use the older effects because they're more direct, more extreme, and they're more like plasticine: you can shape them into loads of things." The 1994 album Mars Audiac Quintet prominently features Moog synthesizers.

Lætitia Sadier's English and French vocals have been a part of Stereolab's music since the beginning, and she would occasionally sing wordlessly along with the music. In reference to her laid-back delivery, Peter Shapiro wrote facetiously in Wire that Sadier "display[ed] all the emotional histrionics of Nico", while some critics have commented that her vocals were unintelligible. Sadier would often trade vocals with Mary Hansen back-and-forth in a sing-song manner that has been described as "eerie" and "hypnotic", as well as "sweet [and] slightly alien". After Hansen's death in 2002, critic Jim Harrington commented that her absence is noticeable on live performances of Stereolab's older tracks, and that their newer songs could have benefited from Hansen's backing vocals.

In interviews, Gane and Sadier have discussed their musical philosophy. Gane said that "to be unique was more important than to be good." On the subject of being too obscure, he said in a 1996 interview that "maybe the area where we're on dodgy ground, is this idea that you need great knowledge [of] esoteric music to understand what we're doing." Sadier responded to Gane, saying that she "think[s] we have achieved a music that will make sense to a lot of people whether they know about Steve Reich or not." The duo were up-front about their desire to grow their sound: for Gane, "otherwise it just sounds like what other people are doing", and for Sadier, "you trust that there is more and that it can be done more interesting."

Influences

Their records have been heavily influenced by the "motorik" technique of 1970s krautrock groups such as Neu! and Faust. Tim Gane has supported the comparison: "Neu! did minimalism and drones, but in a very pop way." Dave Heaton of PopMatters said that their music also had "echoes of bubblegum, of exotica, of Beach Boys and bossa nova", with their earlier work "bearing strong Velvet Underground overtones". Funk, jazz, and Brazilian music were additional inspirations for the band. Stephan Davet of French newspaper Le Monde said that Emperor Tomato Ketchup (1996) had musical influences such as Burt Bacharach, and Françoise Hardy. The sounds influenced by minimalist composers Philip Glass and Steve Reich can be found on the 1999 album Cobra and Phases Group Play Voltage in the Milky Night. Stereolab's style also incorporates easy-listening music of the 1950s and '60s. Joshua Klein in Washington Post said that, "Years before everyone else caught on, Stereolab [were] referencing the 1970s German bands Can and Neu!, the Mexican lounge music master Esquivel and the decidedly unhip Burt Bacharach." Regarding their later work such as Instant 0 in the Universe (2003) and Margerine Eclipse (2004), critics have compared the releases to the band's earlier guitar-driven style.

Live performances
Stereolab toured regularly to support their album releases. In a 1996 Washington Post gig review, Mark Jenkins wrote that Stereolab started out favouring an "easy-listening syncopation", but eventually reverted to a "messier, more urgent sound" characteristic of their earlier performances. In another review Jenkins said that the band's live songs "frequently veer[ed] into more cacophonous, guitar-dominated territory", in contrast to their albums such as Cobra and Phases Group… In the Minneapolis Star Tribune Jon Bream compared the band's live sound to feedback-driven rock bands like the Velvet Underground, Sonic Youth and My Bloody Valentine. Jim Harrington of The Oakland Tribune argued that "Sadier often sounded like a third percussion instrument more than a lead vocalist", further stating in regard to her switching between singing in English and French that "a Stereolab show is one of the few concerts where it's hard to find even the biggest fans mouthing along with the lyrics." Regarding being onstage, Gane has said that "I don't like to be the center of attention ... I just get into the music and am not really aware of the people there. That's my way of getting through it." Remarking of the band's 2019 reunion tour, he added that "[Stereolab] never were really a festival band… We’re not like, 'Hey, how you all doing?' and all that stuff.”

Lyrics and titles
Stereolab's music is politically and philosophically charged. Dave Heaton of PopMatters said that the group "[uses] lyrics to convey ideas while using them for the pleasurable way the words sound." Lætitia Sadier, who writes the group's lyrics, was influenced by both the Situationist philosophy Society of the Spectacle by Marxist theorist Guy Debord, and her anger towards the Iraq War. The Surrealist, as well as other Situationist cultural and political movements were also influences, as stated by Sadier and Gane in a 1999 Salon interview.

Critics have seen Marxist allusions in the band's lyrics, and have gone so far as to call the band members themselves Marxist. Music journalist Simon Reynolds commented that Sadier's lyrics tend to lean towards Marxist social commentary rather than "affairs of the heart". The 1994 single "Ping Pong" has been put forward as evidence in regard to these alleged views. In the song, Sadier sings "about capitalism's cruel cycles of slump and recovery" with lyrics that constitute "a plainspoken explanation of one of the central tenets of Marxian economic analysis" (said critics Reynolds and Stewart Mason, respectively).

Band members have resisted attempts to link the group and its music to Marxism. In a 1999 interview, Gane stated that "none of us are Marxists ... I've never even read Marx." Gane said that although Sadier's lyrics touch on political topics, they do not cross the line into "sloganeering". Sadier also said that she had read very little Marx. In contrast, Cornelius Castoriadis, a radical political philosopher but strong critic of Marxism, has been cited as a marking influence in Sadier's thinking. The name of her side project, Monade, and its debut album title, Socialisme ou Barbarie, are also references to the work of Castoriadis.

Stereolab's album and song titles occasionally reference avant-garde groups and artists. Gane said that the title of their 1999 album Cobra and Phases Group… contains the names of two Surrealist organisations, "CoBrA" and "Phases Group", The title of the song "Brakhage" from Dots and Loops (1997), is a nod to experimental filmmaker Stan Brakhage. Other examples are the 1992 compilation Switched On, named after Wendy Carlos' 1968 album Switched-On Bach, and the 1993 song "Jenny Ondioline", a portmanteau of inventor Georges Jenny and his instrument the Ondioline.

Legacy
Stereolab have been called one of the most "influential" and "fiercely independent and original groups of the Nineties" by writers Stephen Thomas Erlewine and Pierre Perrone respectively; as well as one of "the decade's most innovative British bands." by Mark Jenkins. Simon Reynolds commented in Rolling Stone that the group's earlier records form "an endlessly seductive body of work that sounds always the same, always different." In a review for the 1992 single "John Cage Bubblegum", Jason Ankeny said that "No other artist of its generation fused the high-minded daring of the avant-garde and the lowbrow infectiousness of pop with as much invention, skill, and appeal." In The Wire, Peter Shapiro compared the band to Britpop bands Oasis and Blur, and defended their music against the charge that it is "nothing but the sum total of its arcane reference points." They were one of the first groups to be termed post-rock—in a 1996 article, journalist Angela Lewis applied the "new term" to Stereolab and three other bands who have connections to the group. Stylistically, music journalist J. D. Considine credits the band for anticipating and driving the late 1990s revival of vintage analogue instruments among indie rock bands. Stephen Christian, a creative director of Warp Records, said that the group "exists in the gap between the experimentation of the underground and the appeal of the wider world of pop music".

The group have also received negative press. Barney Hoskyns questioned the longevity of their music in a 1996 Mojo review, saying that their records "sound more like arid experiments than music born of emotional need." In Guardian, Dave Simpson stated: "With their borrowings from early, obscure Kraftwerk and hip obtuse sources, [Stereolab] sound like a band of rock critics rather than musicians." Lætitia Sadier's vocals were cited by author Stuart Shea as often being "indecipherable".

A variety of artists, musical and otherwise, have collaborated with Stereolab. In 1995 the group teamed up with sculptor Charles Long for an interactive art show in New York City, for which Long provided the exhibits and Stereolab the music. They have released tracks by and toured with post-rock band Tortoise, while John McEntire of Tortoise has in turn worked on several Stereolab albums. In the 1990s, the group collaborated with the industrial band Nurse With Wound and released two albums together, Crumb Duck (1993) and Simple Headphone Mind (1998), and Stereolab also released "Calimero" (1998) with French avant-garde singer and poet Brigitte Fontaine. The band worked with Herbie Mann on the song "One Note Samba/Surfboard" for the 1998 AIDS-Benefit album, Red Hot + Rio, produced by the Red Hot Organization.

Stereolab alumni have also founded bands of their own. Guitarist Tim Gane founded the side project Cavern of Anti-Matter and also formed Turn on alongside band member Sean O'Hagan, who formed his own band the High Llamas. Katharine Gifford formed Snowpony with former My Bloody Valentine bassist Debbie Googe. Sadier has released three albums with her four-piece side-project Monade, whose sound Mark Jenkins called a "little more Parisian" than Stereolab's. Backing vocalist Mary Hansen formed a band named Schema with members of Hovercraft and released their eponymous EP in 2000.

As of August 1999, US album sales stood at 300,000 copies sold. Despite receiving critical acclaim and a sizeable fanbase, commercial success eluded the group. Early in their career, their 1993 EP Jenny Ondioline entered the UK Singles Chart, but financial issues prevented the band from printing enough records to satisfy demand. According to Sadier, however, the band "[avoided] going overground" like PJ Harvey, Pulp and the Cranberries, all of whom quickly rose from obscurity to fame, adding: "This kind of notoriety is not a particularly good thing, [and] you don't enjoy it anymore." When Elektra Records was closed down by Warner Bros. Records in 2004, Stereolab was dropped along with many other artists, reportedly because of poor sales. Tim Gane said in retrospect that the group "signed to Elektra because we thought we would be on there for an album or two and then we'd get ejected. We were surprised when we got to our first album!" Since then, Stereolab's self-owned label Duophonic has inked a worldwide distribution deal with independent label Too Pure. Through Duophonic, the band both licenses their music and releases it directly (depending on geographic market). Gane said, "... we license our recordings and just give them to people, then we don't have to ask for permission if we want to use it. We just want to be in control of our own music."

MembersCurrent membersTim Gane - guitar, keyboards 
Lætitia Sadier - lead vocals, keyboards, guitar, percussion, trombone 
Andy Ramsay - drums 
Joseph Watson - keyboards, vibraphone, backing vocals 
Xavier Muñoz Guimera - bass guitar, backing vocals Former membersJoe Dilworth - drums 
Martin Kean - bass guitar 
Gina Morris - backing vocals 
Mick Conroy - keyboards 
Mary Hansen - backing and lead vocals, guitar, keyboards, percussion  
Sean O'Hagan - keyboards, guitar  
Duncan Brown - bass guitar 
Katharine Gifford - keyboards 
Morgane Lhote - keyboards 
David Pajo - bass guitar 
Richard Harrison - bass guitar 
Simon Johns - bass guitar 
Dominic Jeffery - keyboards 
Joseph Walters - french horn, guitar, keyboards 
Julien Gasc - keyboards, backing vocals TimelineDiscography

Stereolab released many non-LP tracks that they later anthologised as compilation albums.Studio albums Peng! (1992)
 Transient Random-Noise Bursts with Announcements (1993)
 Mars Audiac Quintet (1994)
 Emperor Tomato Ketchup (1996)
 Dots and Loops (1997)
 Cobra and Phases Group Play Voltage in the Milky Night (1999)
 Sound-Dust (2001)
 Margerine Eclipse (2004)
 Chemical Chords (2008)
 Not Music (2010)Compilation albums'''
 Switched On (1992)
 Refried Ectoplasm: Switched On, Vol. 2 (1995)
 Aluminum Tunes: Switched On, Vol. 3 (1998)
 ABC Music: The Radio 1 Sessions (2002)
 Oscillons from the Anti-Sun (2005)
 Fab Four Suture (2006)
 Serene Velocity: A Stereolab Anthology (2006)
 Electrically Possessed: Switched On, Vol. 4 (2021)
 Pulse of the Early Brain: Switched On, Vol. 5'' (2022)

References

Book sources

Chart data

External links

 

 

 
Musical groups established in 1990
Musical groups disestablished in 2009
Musical groups reestablished in 2019
English indie rock groups
English post-rock groups
Musical groups from London
Flying Nun Records artists
Drag City (record label) artists
4AD artists
British indie pop groups
English experimental rock groups
Art pop musicians
Experimental pop musicians
Avant-pop musicians
Slumberland Records artists